Laurence Hourdel (born 18 August 1965) is a French rower. She competed in the women's single sculls event at the 1984 Summer Olympics.

References

1965 births
Living people
French female rowers
Olympic rowers of France
Rowers at the 1984 Summer Olympics
Place of birth missing (living people)